Sustainable Development Goal 13 (SDG 13 or Global Goal 13) is to limit and adapt to climate change. It is one of 17 Sustainable Development Goals established by the United Nations General Assembly in 2015. The official mission statement of this goal is to "Take urgent action to combat climate change and its impacts". SDG 13 and SDG 7 on clean energy are closely related and complementary. 

SDG 13 has five targets which are to be achieved by 2030. They cover a wide range of issues surrounding climate action. The first three targets are outcome targets: Strengthen resilience and adaptive capacity to climate-related disasters; integrate climate change measures into policies and planning; build knowledge and capacity to meet climate change. The remaining two targets are means of implementation targets: To implement the UN Framework Convention on Climate Change (UNFCCC), and to promote mechanisms to raise capacity for planning and management. Along with each target, there are indicators that provide a method to review the overall progress of each target. The UNFCCC is the primary international, intergovernmental forum for negotiating the global response to climate change.

The average worldwide temperature in 2021 was approximately 1.1°C higher than pre-industrial levels (from 1850 to 1900). The years from 2015 to 2021 were the seven warmest on record; the top three being 2016, 2019 and 2020. Currently climate change is affecting the global community in every nation across the world. The impact of climate change not only impacts national economies, but also lives and livelihoods, especially those in vulnerable conditions. By 2018, climate change continued exacerbating the frequency of natural disasters, such as massive wildfires, droughts, hurricanes, and floods. Over the period 2000–2018, the greenhouse emissions of developed countries in transitions have declined by 6.5%. However, the emissions of the developing countries are up by 43% in the period between 2000 and 2013. In 2019, at least 120 of 153 developing countries had undertaken activities to formulate and implement national adaptation plans.

The leading sources of the greenhouse gas savings that countries need to focus on in order to fulfill their commitments under the Paris Agreement are switching fuels to renewable energy and enhancing end-use energy efficiency.

Background 

SDG 13 intends to take urgent action in order to combat climate change and its impacts. The contributing countries to this SDG are making plans to prioritize food security and production, terrestrial and wetland ecosystems, freshwater resources, human health, and key economic sectors and services.

The year 2019 was the second warmest on record with an average temperature of 1.71 degrees F above the 20th-century average.  Carbon dioxide levels and other greenhouse gases also rose to new records in 2019. It was at the end of the warmest decade, from 2010 to 2019.

The UN discussions and negotiations identified the links between the post-2015 SDG process and the Financing for Development process that concluded in Addis Ababa in July 2015 and the COP 21 Climate Change conference in Paris in December 2015.

The Paris Agreement, adopted in 2015, aims to strengthen the global response to the threat of climate change by keeping a global temperature rise this century well below 2 degrees Celsius above pre-industrial levels. The Agreement aims to strengthen the ability of countries to deal with the impacts of climate change, through appropriate financial flows, a new technology framework and an enhanced capacity building framework. It also provides a path for the more developed countries to help out the undeveloped countries by adapting to the changes with trying to help fight against climate change. The main goal of the Agreement is to eventually become a net-zero emissions world; however, the implementation of the Sustainable Development Goals is crucial for the Paris Agreement to be of any effect.

In 2018, the Intergovernmental Panel on Climate Change (IPCC), the United Nations body for assessing the science related to climate change, published a special report "Global Warming of 1.5 °C". It outlined the impacts of a 1.5 °C global temperature rise above pre-industrial levels and related global greenhouse gas emission pathways, and highlighted the possibility of avoiding a number of such impacts by limiting global warming to 1.5 °C compared to 2 °C, or more. The report mentioned that this would require global net human-caused emissions of carbon dioxide (CO2) to fall by about 45% from 2010 levels by 2030, reaching "net zero" around 2050, through “rapid and far-reaching” transitions in land, energy, industry, buildings, transport, and cities.

In 2022, the report the Intergovernmental Panel on Climate Change (IPCC) published, some of the topics covered were the different emission trends, longterm pathways for mitigation, national policies, international cooperation, and how to accelerate the transition to more sustainable development.

Targets, indicators and progress

SDG 13 has five targets. The targets include to strengthening resilience and adaptive capacity to climate-related disasters (Target 13.1), integrate climate change measures into policies and planning (Target 13.2), build knowledge and capacity to meet climate change (Target 13.3), implement the UN Framework Convention on Climate Change (Target 13.a), and promote mechanisms to raise capacity for planning and management (Target 13.b).

Each target includes one or more indicators that help to measure and monitor the progress. Some of the indicators are number of deaths, missing people and directly affected people attributed to disasters per 100,000 population (13.1.1) or total greenhouse emissions generated by year (13.2.2.)

Target 13.1: Strengthen resilience and adaptive capacity to climate-related disasters 
The full text of Target 13.1 is: "Strengthen resilience and adaptive capacity to climate-related hazards and natural disasters in all countries".

This target has 3 indicators.

 Indicator 13.1.1: "Number of deaths, missing people and directly affected people attributed to disasters per 100,000 population"
 Indicator 13.1.2: "Number of countries that adopt and implement national disaster risk reduction strategies in line with the Sendai Framework for Disaster Risk Reduction 2015–2030"
 Indicator 13.1.3: "Proportion of local governments that adopt and implement local disaster risk reduction strategies in line with national disaster risk reduction strategies"

For Indicator 13.1.1 the United Nations considers three concepts that are relevant for its understanding: a) Death, which is related to people who died during the disaster, or directly after, as a result of the hazardous event; b) Missing, people whose whereabouts are unknown since the hazardous event; and c) Directly affected refers to the people who have suffered injuries, illness, or other health effects; who were evacuated, displaced, relocated, or have suffered direct damage to their livelihoods, economic, physical, social, cultural, and environmental assets.

Indicator 13.1.2 serves as a bridge between the Sustainable Development Goals and the Sendai Framework for Disaster Risk Reduction.

Indicator 13.1.3 needs to be aligned with the Sendai Framework for Disaster Risk Reduction 2015–2030, disaster risk reduction and should mainstream and integrate disaster risk reduction within and across all sectors.

By 2018, climate change continued exacerbating the frequency of natural disasters, such as massive wildfires, droughts, hurricanes, and floods, affecting more than 39 million of people. In April 2020, the number of countries and territories that adopted national disaster risk reduction strategies increased to 118 compared to 48 from the first year of the Sendai Framework.

Approximately 60,000 people globally die from the natural disasters each year. Totally, the deaths from natural disasters represent around 0.1% of global deaths. However, in case of high-impact events, the number can change and range from 0.01% to 0.4% of total deaths.

There was a significant decline in global deaths from natural disasters since second half of the 20th century. At the beginning of 20th century, the annual average was around 400,000–500,000 deaths. In the early 2000s, there has been a significant decline to 100,000 and less. That is at least five times lower than in the early 1900s. Considering this data in terms of death rates a population growth (measured per 100,000 people) – there was at least 10-fold decline over the past century.

Improvement in living standards is crucial to avoid more deaths or injuries from the natural disasters. Access to resilient infrastructure, local development and effective response systems are especially problematic in low-income countries, which are facing higher risks during natural disasters.

Target 13.2: Integrate climate change measures into policy and planning 
The full text of Target 13.2 is: "Integrate climate change measures into national policies, strategies and planning".

This target has two indicators:

 Indicator 13.2.1: "Number of countries with nationally determined contributions, long-term strategies, national adaptation plans, strategies as reported in adaptation communications and national communications".
 Indicator 13.2.2: "Total greenhouse gas emissions per year"

In order to avoid catastrophic impacts, carbon dioxide (CO₂) emissions need to decline by about 45%by 2030 and reach net zero in 2050. To be able to meet the 1.5 °C or even 2 °C, which is the maximum target made by the Paris Agreement, greenhouse gas emissions must start to fall by 7.6% per year starting on 2020. However, the world is way off track in meeting this target at the current level of nationally determined contributions. Over the period 2000–2018, green house emissions of developed countries and economies in transitions have declined by 6.5%. The emissions of the developing countries are up by 43% in the period between 2000 and 2013.

As of 2015 170 countries are a part of at least one multilateral environmental agreement. With each year having an increase in the amount of countries signing onto environmental agreements.

Target 13.3: Build knowledge and capacity to meet climate change  
The full text of Target 13.3 is: "Improve education, awareness-raising and human and institutional capacity on climate change mitigation, adaptation, impact reduction and early warning".

This target has two indicators:

 Indicator 13.3.1: "The extent to which (i) global citizenship education and (ii) education for sustainable development are mainstreamed in (a) national education policies; (b) curricula; (c) teacher education; and (d) student assessment"
 Indicator 13.3.2: "Number of countries that have communicated the strengthening of institutional, systemic and individual capacity-building to implement adaptation, mitigation and technology transfer, and development actions"

The indicator 13.3.1 measures the extent to which countries mainstream Global Citizenship Education (GCED) and Education for Sustainable Development (ESD) in their education systems and educational policies.

The indicator 13.3.2 identifies countries who have and have not adopted and implemented disaster risk management strategies in line with the Sendai Framework for Disaster Risk Reduction. The goal by 2030 is to strengthen resilience and adaptive capacity to climate-related hazards and natural disasters in all countries.

To explain the concept of "Education for Sustainable Development and Global Citizenship seeks to equip learners with the knowledge of how their choices impact others and their immediate environment.

There are currently no data available for this indicator as of September 2020.

Target 13.a: Implement the UN Framework Convention on Climate Change 
 
The full text of Target 13.a is: "Implement the commitment undertaken by developed-country parties to the United Nations Framework Convention on Climate Change to a goal of mobilizing jointly $100 billion annually by 2020 from all sources to address the needs of developing countries in the context of meaningful mitigation actions and transparency on implementation and fully operationalize the Green Climate Fund through its capitalization as soon as possible."

This target only has one indicator: Indicator 13.a is the "Amounts provided and mobilized in United States dollars per year in relation to the continued existing collective mobilization goal of the $100 billion commitment through to 2025".

Previously, the indicator was worded as "Mobilized amount of United States dollars per year between 2020 and 2025 accountable towards the $100 billion commitment".

This indicator measures the current pledged commitments from countries to the Green Climate Fund (GCF), the amounts provided and mobilized in United States dollars (USD) per year in relation to the continued existing collective mobilization goal of the US$100 billion commitment to 2025. As of 2018, $51.93 billion had been contributed showing an increase from the $45.51 billion that was provided in 2017.

Regarding funding, by December 2019, 81 countries submitted 83 proposals totaling $203.8 million requesting support from the GCF.

There was an increase of $681 billion from 2015 to 2016 with regard to global climate finance. Renewable energy received high levels of new private investment. This represents the largest segment of the global total. These financial flows are relatively small in relation to the scale of annual investment needed for a low-carbon, climate-resilient transition.

In April 2018, 175 countries ratified the Paris Agreement and 168 parties had communicated their first nationally determined contributions to the UN framework convention on Climate Change Secretariat. As of March 2020, 189 countries had ratified the Paris Agreement and 186 of them – including the European Union – have communicated their Nationally Determined Contributions (NDC) to the Secretariat of the United Nations Framework Convention on Climate Change.

Target 13.b: Promote mechanisms to raise capacity for planning and management   

The full text of Target 13.b is: "Promote mechanisms for raising capacity for effective climate change-related planning and management in least developed countries and small island developing States, including focusing on women, youth and local and marginalized communities acknowledging that the United Nations Framework Convention on Climate Change is the primary international, intergovernmental forum for negotiating the global response to climate change."

This target has one indicator: Indicator 13.b.1 is the "Number of least developed countries and small island developing states with nationally determined contributions, long-term strategies, national adaptation plans, strategies as reported in adaptation communications and national communications".

A previous version of this indicator was: "Indicator 13.b.1: Number of least developed countries and small island developing states that are receiving specialized support, and amount of support, including finance, technology and capacity building, for mechanisms for raising capacities for effective climate change-related planning and management, including focusing on women, youth and local and marginalized communities." This indicator's previous focus on women, youth and local and marginalized communities is not included anymore in the latest version of the indicator.

In 2019, at least 120 of 153 developing countries had undertaken activities to formulate and implement national adaptation plans. This is an increase of 29 countries, compared with 2018. The plans will help countries achieve the global goal on adaptation under the Paris Agreement.

Custodian agencies 
Custodian agencies are in charge of reporting on the following indicators:

 Indicators 13.1.1, 13.1.2 and 13.1.3: UN International Strategy for Disaster Reduction (UNISDR).
 Indicator 13.2.1: United Nations Framework Convention on Climate Change (UNFCCC), UN Educational, Scientific, and Cultural Organization-Institute for Statistics (UNESCO-UIS).
 Indicators 13.3.1, 13.a.1 and 13.b.1: United Nations Framework Convention on Climate Change (UNFCCC) and Organization for Economic Cooperation and Development (OECD).

Monitoring

High-level progress reports for all the SDGs are published in the form of reports by the United Nations Secretary General. The most recent one is from April 2020. Updates and progress can also be found on the SDG website that is managed by the United Nations and at Our World in Data. In a progress update reported by the United Nations, it is made clear that SDG 13 has made little progress towards reducing global greenhouse gas emissions.

Challenges

Impacts of the COVID-19 pandemic 
As a result of the COVID-19 pandemic, there has been a drastic reduction in human activity. This has resulted in a 6% drop in greenhouse gas emissions from what was initially projected for 2020, however these improvements are only temporary. Once the global economy begins to recover from the pandemic, emissions are expected to rise once again to high levels.

Despite the slight benefits to emissions reduction which the COVID-19 pandemic has caused, SDG 13 still faces several threats to its progress. The GHG emissions saw a decline from 36.7 billion metric tons to 34.81 billion metric tons emitted from 2019 to 2020, however these emissions have already seen a sharp increase back to 36.4 billion metric tons emitted in 2021. Also, energy-related CO2 emissions for 2021 increased by 6%, hitting their highest level ever and erasing the pandemic-related decrease witnessed in 2020. This is due to the rush for governments globally to stimulate local economies by putting money towards fossil fuel production and in turn economic stimulation. Funding for economic policies will likely divert the emergency funds usually afforded to climate funding like The Green Climate Fund and other sustainable policies, unless an emphasis is put on green deals in the redirection of monetary funds.

A rebound in transport pollution has occurred since restrictions of government lockdown policies have been lifted. Transport pollution accounts for roughly 21% of global carbon emissions due to it being still 95% dependent on oil. This is because countries like the United States are reducing efficiency standards and restricting environmental standard enforcement. The outcome of the UN Climate Change Conference UK '20, or, COP26, was postponed to October 31, 2021, where action was agreed upon to accelerate the rate in which GHG emissions are limited. This included strictly steering away from coal usage and oil, along with attempting to reach zero emissions from transport by 2040, among many other items of action discussed in COP26.

Links with other SDGs 

The Sustainable Development Goal 13 is related tightly with the other SDGs. For the achievement of the Sustainable Development Goals the implementation the Paris Agreement is essential.

It was stated in 2015 that a high-ambition climate agreement is most crucial to achieving the SDGs relating to poverty (SDG 1), inequality (SDG 10), climate change (SDG 13) and global partnerships for sustainable development (SDG 17). The report also states that tackling climate change will only be possible if the SDGs are met. Further, economic development and climate change are inextricably linked, particularly around poverty, gender equality, and energy. The UN encourages the public sector to take initiative in this effort to minimize negative impacts on the environment.

SDG 13 (Climate Action) is vital in enabling other Sustainable Development Goals to succeed. Not only SDG 13 but all other SDGs need to be collaboratively conducted in harmony to achieve the mutual goal of developing a sustainable society. In comparison with the other 17 sustainable development goals, SDG 13 (Climate Action) and SDG 4 (Quality Education) are considered to be the two most impactful. Additionally, two other SDGs that will significantly influence the course of success in the other 15 SDGs are SDG 16 (Peace Justice and Strong Institution) and SDG 17 (Partnership for Goals). These two SDGs will guide how other SDGs implement their actions and management. 

Additionally, the decrease in gas emissions resulting from the actions of SDG 13 will benefit many other SDGs. Those SDGs include good health & well-being (SDG 3), clean water & sanitation (SDG 6), responsible consumption & production (SDG 12), life below water (SDG 14), and life on land (SDG 15).

SDG 13 is closely tied to other SDGs in a sense that the climate crisis is a globally experienced phenomenon. The climate on earth closely dictates the state of how humanity can function. For example SDG 2, which has a target to end hunger. Agriculture across the globe is niche, and majority of agricultural products are not generalist and requires particular environmental conditions in order to be successful. With global climate changing so rapidly, this coincides with a steady decline in available area to produce a sufficient amount of agricultural products. For example, sea-level rise, a direct impact of climate change, can lead to saline intrusion of groundwater aquifers, increasing the salinity of water supplies used for agriculture. This is currently happening in the Mekong delta, a region that produces the most rice for Vietnam, a country with a 19.3% share of the global rice trade. However, increased saline levels in agricultural water supplies have significantly lowered their production, which has already created national concern and, if left unresolved, could lead to a global shortage of rice. Saline intrusion also affects SDG 6, "Ensure availability and sustainable management of water and sanitation for all." As saline intrusion can penetrate coastal groundwater aquifers, communities with limited freshwater sources like those on islands are likely to face increased saline contamination events leading to freshwater shortages as sea levels continue to rise. SDG 13 and SDG 7 on clean energy are also closely related and complementary. The leading sources of the greenhouse gas savings that countries need to focus on in order to realize their commitments under the Paris Agreement are switching fuels to renewable energy and enhancing end-use energy efficiency.

Another SDG which is linked closely with SDG 13 is SDG 12, which is about responsible production and consumption. Currently, production and consumption are increasing exponentially, which is not sustainable long-term. Many increased levels of greenhouse gas emissions began during the industrial revolution due to the increased usage of heavy machinery and the burning of fossil fuels. Due to industrialization, there have been significant increases in both production and consumption, to the detriment of our environment. These two sustainable development goals are linked because as one decreases, so does the other. SDG 13 is closely tied to various other SDGs in that the climate crisis is a globally experienced phenomenon. The climate on earth closely dictates the state of how humanity can function.

Organizations

United Nations organizations 

 The United Nations Framework Convention on Climate Change (UNFCC) secretariat supports the response to climate change of its 197 parties in advancing the implementation of the UNFCC, the Kyoto Protocol and the Paris Agreement, providing technical expertise, assisting them on the analysis on the information they do report on the frame of the implementation of the Kyoto mechanism and maintains the registry of the National Determined Contributions (NDCs). The United Nations Framework Convention on Climate Change (UNFCCC) was created as a pioneer step to address climate change by the United Nations. With currently 197 parties (countries) which ratifying the convention, it calls for member states to even in moments of scientific uncertainty, act in the interest of human safety.
 UNFCCC Non Parties Participants are organized in three different categories to attend and participate of the UNFCCC process' conferences and meetings: 1. United Nations System and its Specialized Agencies, intergovernmental organizations (IGOs), and non-governmental organizations (NGOs). By 2018, the admitted observers included over 2,200 NGOs and 130 IGOs.
 The Intergovernmental Panel on Climate Change (IPCC): provides governments on their different constituencies with scientific information, regarding climate change, its impact, future risk adaptation and mitigation processes, so they can develop their climate policies. The IPPC issues reports that are key for international climate negotiations.
 The Conferences of the Parties (COP): the main international body to measure the actions taken by parties (countries) and the progress made regarding the effective implementation of the United Nations Framework Convention on Climate Change (UNFCCC), that is held every year, unless the parties decide otherwise.
 World Meteorological Organization (WMO)
 UN-Habitat: promotes social and environmentally sustainable towns, cities and communities as part of its mandates by the United Nations General Assembly (UNGA).
 United Nations Environment Program (UNEP): global authority that sets the environmental agenda, enabling nations and people to improve their quality of life without compromising future generations.   
 Green Climate Fund (GCF), established in 2010 by the United Nations Framework Convention on Climate Change (UNFCCC): the GCF is the largest dedicated fund dedicated to help developing countries reduce their greenhouse gas emissions and enhance their ability to respond to climate change.
 NDC Partnerships, hosted by the World Resource Institute and the United Nations Climate Change: this partnership with over 100 members that include developed and developing countries worldwide, non state actors and major institutions to fast track climate and development actions supporting countries to implement their Nationally Determined Contributions (NDCs), which are part of their commitments to the Paris Agreement.
 YOUNGO: recognized on 2009 by the UNFCCC as the official youth constituency, was fully recognized at COP 17 at Durban, South Africa on 2011 after operating on a provisional status. YOUNGO is a network or youth lead, organization, groups, delegations and individuals working on climate affairs, ensuring youth perspectives and future generations are taken in consideration at the UNFCCC negotiations and multilateral decision-making processes.

References

External links 

 UN Sustainable Development Knowledge Platform – SDG 13
 “Global Goals” Campaign - SDG 13
 SDG-Track.org - SDG 13
 UN SDG 13 in the US

Sustainable development
Sustainable Development Goals
Climate change mitigation
Climate change adaptation
Climate change policy